The Detroit–Windsor Truck Ferry is a ferry service that has transported cars and trucks across the Detroit River for over 100 years.

The service is split between two companies, Detroit–Windsor Truck Ferry, Incorporated of Detroit and CMT Canadian Maritime Transport, Limited of Windsor.

It currently accepts only trucks. The ferry is the primary crossing for hazardous materials (HAZMAT) trucks between Windsor and La Salle in Ontario, and Detroit and the Downriver communities in Michigan, although other transport trucks may use it as a time-saving alternative to the bridges. Hazardous materials have been banned from the Ambassador Bridge and Detroit–Windsor Tunnel. The nearest alternative crossing that allows hazardous or radioactive materials is the Bluewater Bridge, which connects Port Huron, Michigan, and Sarnia, Ontario.

Similar to all the international crossings in the Detroit–Windsor area, a toll is required, as is clearance from Canada Border Services Agency and the U.S. Customs and Border Protection at both terminals of the ferry route.

Location 

On the Windsor side of the river, the truck ferry entrance is at 5550 Maplewood Drive, accessed from Ojibway Parkway via Sprucewood Avenue, near the Windsor Salt Mine.

On the Detroit side of the river, the truck ferry entrance is at 1475 Springwells Court; that street intersects West Jefferson Avenue between South Schroeder Street and South Post Street. The dock is at the mouth of the River Rouge across from Zug Island.

Customs offices are at the entrances, and one must make a clearance with Customs before embarking onto the truck ferry, for standard procedures.

Ferry

The ferry is a flat open unpowered dumb barge with a pilot house located on one end. The barge is towed by MV Stormont, a diesel harbour tow tug.

Operating Time

The ferry makes 5 trips from each side of the Detroit River from 7am (Detroit side) and 8am (Windsor side) to 3pm (last departure time). One way crossing takes 20 minutes.

References

External links 
 Official Truck Ferry Site

Ferries of Ontario
Ferries of Michigan
Transportation in Detroit
Transport in Windsor, Ontario
Canada–United States border crossings
Detroit River